Romain Gasmi (born 15 February 1987 in Lyon, Rhône-Alpes) is a French footballer of Algeria.

Career
On 1 September 2008, Gasmi joined Southampton on a season long loan, with a view to a permanent deal. He went on to make his debut coming on as substitute for David McGoldrick in the goalless home draw against Plymouth Argyle on 25 November.

References

External links

Romain Gasmi Joins Thai Division 1 League Side Bangkok United For 2 Years with 1 optional year after that.

1987 births
Living people
French footballers
French expatriate footballers
Footballers from Lyon
RC Strasbourg Alsace players
Southampton F.C. players
French sportspeople of Algerian descent
Expatriate footballers in Thailand
French expatriate sportspeople in Thailand
Romain Gasmi
Romain Gasmi
Association football midfielders
ASOA Valence players
GOAL FC players
Romain Gasmi